Golden Hills is a census-designated place (CDP) in the Tehachapi Mountains, in Kern County, California, United States. The population was 8,656 at the 2010 census, up from 7,434 at the 2000 census. Golden Hills adjoins the city of Tehachapi on the west.

Geography

Demographics

2010
At the 2010 census Golden Hills had a population of 8,656. The racial makeup of Golden Hills was 7,235 (83.6%) White, 129 (1.5%) African American, 124 (1.4%) Native American, 120 (1.4%) Asian, 15 (0.2%) Pacific Islander, 670 (7.7%) from other races, and 363 (4.2%) from two or more races. Hispanic or Latino of any race were 1,674 persons (19.3%).

The whole population lived in households, no one lived in non-institutionalized group quarters and no one was institutionalized.

There were 3,216 households, 1,173 (36.5%) had children under the age of 18 living in them, 1,887 (58.7%) were opposite-sex married couples living together, 339 (10.5%) had a female householder with no husband present, 144 (4.5%) had a male householder with no wife present.  There were 188 (5.8%) unmarried opposite-sex partnerships, and 15 (0.5%) same-sex married couples or partnerships. 672 households (20.9%) were one person and 247 (7.7%) had someone living alone who was 65 or older. The average household size was 2.69.  There were 2,370 families (73.7% of households); the average family size was 3.11.

The age distribution was 2,245 people (25.9%) under the age of 18, 819 people (9.5%) aged 18 to 24, 1,872 people (21.6%) aged 25 to 44, 2,648 people (30.6%) aged 45 to 64, and 1,072 people (12.4%) who were 65 or older.  The median age was 38.6 years. For every 100 females, there were 99.9 males.  For every 100 females age 18 and over, there were 98.4 males.

There were 3,522 housing units at an average density of 287.1 per square mile, of the occupied units 2,204 (68.5%) were owner-occupied and 1,012 (31.5%) were rented. The homeowner vacancy rate was 2.3%; the rental vacancy rate was 9.5%.  5,836 people (67.4% of the population) lived in owner-occupied housing units and 2,820 people (32.6%) lived in rental housing units.

2000
As of the census of 2000, there were 7,434 people, 2,547 households, and 2,019 families living in the CDP. The racial makeup of the CDP was 83.24% White, 1.30% Black or African American, 0.85% Native American, 1.44% Asian, 0.08% Pacific Islander, 7.88% from other races, and 5.21% from two or more races.  16.52% of the population were Hispanic or Latino of any race.

Of the 2,547 households 46.0% had children under the age of 18 living with them, 65.1% were married couples living together, 9.4% had a female householder with no husband present, and 20.7% were non-families. 17.9% of households were one person and 6.1% were one person aged 65 or older.  The average household size was 2.92 and the average family size was 3.30.

The age distribution was 33.8% under the age of 18, 7.4% from 18 to 24, 27.9% from 25 to 44, 21.5% from 45 to 64, and 9.4% 65 or older.  The median age was 34 years. For every 100 females, there were 100.5 males.  For every 100 females age 18 and over, there were 96.1 males.

The median household income was $48,047 and the median family income  was $55,906. Males had a median income of $47,833 versus $29,815 for females. The per capita income for the CDP was $19,333.  About 6.5% of families and 7.8% of the population were below the poverty line, including 8.5% of those under age 18 and 12.4% of those age 65 or over.

References

Census-designated places in Kern County, California
Tehachapi Mountains
Census-designated places in California